John Morrison (October 29, 1872, Mt. Charles, Ontario – November 6, 1950, Yellow Grass) was a Canadian politician.

Morrison was a House of Commons of Canada member for the Progressive Party of Canada from 1921 to 1925 representing the riding of Weyburn. At the time of his election he was a farmer residing in Yellow Grass, Saskatchewan.

He was defeated in the 1925 election and unsuccessfully ran in the 1926 election.

References
 

Members of the House of Commons of Canada from Saskatchewan
Progressive Party of Canada MPs
1872 births
1950 deaths